The knockout stage of the men's football tournament at the 2016 Summer Olympics was played from 13 to 20 August 2016. The top two teams from each group in the group stage qualified for the knockout stage.

All times are local, BRT (UTC−3).

Qualified teams

Bracket
In the knockout stages, if a match was level at the end of normal playing time, extra time was played (two periods of fifteen minutes each) and followed, if necessary, by a penalty shoot-out to determine the winner.

On 18 March 2016, the FIFA Executive Committee agreed that the competition would be part of the International Football Association Board's trial to allow a fourth substitute to be made during extra time.

Quarter-finals

Portugal vs Germany

Nigeria vs Denmark

South Korea vs Honduras

Brazil vs Colombia

Semi-finals

Brazil vs Honduras

Nigeria vs Germany

Bronze medal match

Gold medal match

The final pitted host Brazil against defending world champions Germany, with both teams seeking their first Olympic title despite having won a combined nine World Cups. Both opposing coaches — Rogerio Micale for Brazil and Horst Hrubesch for Germany — downplayed the fact that the gold medal match was a rematch of the 2014 World Cup semi-final in Belo Horizonte, known in Brazil as the Mineirazo after Germany had won 7–1.

Brazil took the lead through a first-half free kick from Neymar, the senior team captain and one of the Brazilian players who had lost the gold medal match in the London 2012 Olympic tournament against Mexico at Wembley. Opposing German captain Max Meyer then equalised in the second half for Germany with a half-volley off a cross. Neither team was able to score again after 120 minutes, meaning the final went to penalties for the first time since 2000 when Cameroon had beaten Spain in a shootout in Sydney. Both teams scored on their first four penalties, with the breakthrough coming when Weverton saved the German fifth penalty from substitute Nils Petersen.	
Neymar then converted Brazil's fifth penalty to seal Olympic gold for Brazil in football for the first time. Brazil's victory also meant that the team had won every major global tournament at least once (World Cup, Confederations Cup and Olympics) and was also the first host nation victory in an Olympic tournament since Spain won the Barcelona 1992 tournament.

References

External links
Football – Men, Rio2016.com
Men's Olympic Football Tournament, Rio 2016, FIFA.com

knockout stage